Kokeon is a village in the Nicobar district of Andaman and Nicobar Islands, India. It is located in the Great Nicobar tehsil.

Demographics 

The village was severely affected by the 2004 Indian Ocean earthquake and tsunami. A team of researchers who visited the village in February 2005, found only abandoned huts of the village's former Shompen inhabitants. According to the 2011 census of India, Kokeon has only 6 households left. The literacy rate of the village is 0.

References 

Villages in Great Nicobar tehsil